Federal Governmental Institution — penal colony No. 6 of the Federal Penitentiary Service of Russia in Khabarovsk Krai, commonly known as the Snowflake (Snezhinka) is a prison in Elban, Khabarovsk Krai, Russia. It is a supermax corrective labor colony operated by the Federal Penitentiary Service for convicts sentenced to life imprisonment. The Snowflake appears to be the newest prison of the seven prisons of this type in Russia.

The Snowflake became the first and only prison for life prisoners in the Far East. In 1996, the construction of a pre-trial detention center with a capacity of 800 beds was started in its place. The facility was completed in 2012, put into operation in early 2014. The nickname of the prison comes from the seven-beam shape of its buildings.

In July 2017, the Federal Penitentiary Service for the Khabarovsk Krai reported that the insulator would be reclassified into a prison for life convicts. On September 20, the institution started working as a corrective labor colony and began receiving the first prisoners who were brought from other penitentiary institutions in Russia (mainly from the closing Black Eagle prison). Sewing and woodworking workshops have appeared on the territory of the prison. As of November 2017, there were 23 people in the Snowflake, and by June 2020 the number had raised to 250.

References

Prisons in Russia
Buildings and structures in Khabarovsk Krai
2017 establishments in Russia